Town Center Mall may refer to:

Town Center at Aurora, shopping mall in Aurora, Colorado (formerly known as Aurora Mall)
Town Center at Boca Raton, shopping mall in Boca Raton, Florida
Town Center at Cobb, shopping mall in Kennesaw, Georgia
Town Center at Corte Madera, shopping mall in Corte Madera, California
Sunnyvale Town Center, former shopping mall in Sunnyvale, California
Santa Maria Town Center, shopping mall in Santa Maria, California

See also
Town centre